WGRC (91.3 FM) is a Christian adult contemporary music formatted radio station located in Lewisburg, Pennsylvania. WGRC first signed on the air April 22, 1988.

Simulcasts
In addition to its primary frequency, WGRC can be heard on several relay stations and translators in north central PA, and streaming on the internet.

Translators

External links

GRC
Radio stations established in 1988
1988 establishments in Pennsylvania
Contemporary Christian radio stations in the United States